Saurabh Srivastava is an Indian politician and a member of Uttar Pradesh Legislative Assembly.
He is very active politician as well as businessman. He is a C&F Agent of products of Dabur, Bismark Biscuit and Everyday battery etc.
He is well spoken person of Bhartiya Janta Party of Varanasi and MLA of greatest population constituency of Varanasi Cantt.

References
http://www.news18.com/news/politics/varanasi-cantt-election-results-2017-saurabh-srivastava-of-bjp-wins-1358844.html
http://m.timesofindia.com/elections/assembly-elections/uttar-pradesh/news/resentment-continues-to-grow-in-bjp-camp-in-varanasi-over-ticket-distribution/articleshow/57003064.cms

Living people
Bharatiya Janata Party politicians from Uttar Pradesh
1975 births
Politicians from Varanasi
Uttar Pradesh MLAs 2022–2027